Cornerstone Schools may refer to:
 Cornerstone Schools (Georgia)
 Cornerstone Schools (Michigan)